Henry Eric Harden  (23 February 1912 – 23 January 1945) was an English recipient of the Victoria Cross, the highest and most prestigious award for gallantry in the face of the enemy that can be awarded to British and Commonwealth forces.

Details
Harden was a 32-year-old, lance-corporal in the Royal Army Medical Corps attached No. 45 (Royal Marine) Commando during the Second World War when the following deed took place for which he was awarded the Victoria Cross.

On 23 January 1945 during Operation Blackcock, at Brachterbeek, the Netherlands, three marines of the leading section of the Royal Marine Commando Troop to which Lance-Corporal Harden was attached fell, wounded. The Commando section had come under heavy machine-gun fire in the open field that morning, and the men were seriously wounded. One of the casualties was Lieutenant Corey. Under intense mortar and machine-gun fire Harden was wounded in his side as he carried one man back to the aid post, which had been set up in one of the houses along the Stationsweg in Brachterbeek. Against the orders of another Medical officer he then returned with a stretcher party for the other two wounded. Bringing in the second casualty the rescue party came under enemy fire which killed the wounded Commando. While finally bringing back the third man Lieutenant Corey, who had demanded he be recovered last, Harden was shot through the head and killed instantly. Henry Eric Harden was then 32 years old, married and father of a son and daughter. He was posthumously awarded the Victoria Cross for his fearless action. On the bridge near the mill there is a plaque to commemorate Lance Corporal Harden.

Lance-Corporal Harden's final resting place is in the Commonwealth War Graves Commission cemetery at Nederweert, Limburg, the Netherlands.

Known locally by his friends & family simply as Eric, his death was recently commemorated in his home town of Northfleet

The medal
His Victoria Cross is displayed at the Army Medical Services Museum in Mytchett, Surrey.

References

British VCs of World War 2 (John Laffin, 1997)
Monuments to Courage (David Harvey, 1999)
The Register of the Victoria Cross (This England, 1997)

External links
 Henry Eric Harden - article at "Oorlog in Limburg" with full details and numerous images of Harden and memorials
 "Commando Medic" - Google eBook by Stephen J Snelling with substantial preview

1912 births
1945 deaths
British World War II recipients of the Victoria Cross
British Army personnel killed in World War II
Royal Army Medical Corps soldiers
People from Northfleet
British Army recipients of the Victoria Cross
Military personnel from Kent